Jin Yi-han (born Kim Hyun-Joong on October 10, 1978) is a South Korean actor. He began his acting career in 2002 in musical theatre, notably in Footloose. Jin soon branched out into television, and among his leading roles were in critically acclaimed Conspiracy in the Court (2007), family drama My Life's Golden Age (2008), daily drama Happiness in the Wind (2010), sitcom You're Here, You're Here, You're Really Here (2011), and mystery-romance My Secret Hotel (2014). He also played supporting roles in Who Are You? (2008), Bravo, My Love! (2011), Dr. Jin (2012), and Empress Ki (2013).

On September 23, 2016, Jin Yi-han changed his stage name to Kim Ji-han.

Filmography

Television series

Film

Variety show

Music video

Theater

Awards and nominations

References

External links

South Korean male television actors
South Korean male film actors
South Korean male musical theatre actors
South Korean male stage actors
Seoul Institute of the Arts alumni
1978 births
Living people
Gwangsan Kim clan